The Kangaroo Island power station is a set of diesel generators located at the Kingscote substation at Brownlow KI on Kangaroo Island.

It consists of three 2MWe Caterpillar 3516B generators capable of providing a combined 6MW of power.

Owned and operated by SA Power Networks, it is used to provide stability of supply if both of the submarine power cables to the mainland are unavailable.

See also 
 List of power stations in South Australia

References

Diesel power stations in South Australia
Kangaroo Island